The 1968 Individual Long Track European Championship was the 12th edition of the Long Track European Championship. The final was held on 30 June 1968 in Mühldorf, West Germany.

The title was won by Manfred Poschenreider of West Germany for the third successive year. He was the first rider to achieve the feat of winning three titles.

Venues
Qualifying Round 1 - Scheeßel, 26 May 1968
Scandinavian final - Nyköping, 26 May 1968
Qualifying Round 2 - Gornja Radgona, 2 June 1968
semi-final - Hamburg, 9 June 1968
Final - Mühldorf - 30 June 1968

Final Classification

References 

Motor
Motor
International sports competitions hosted by West Germany